Camilla Lennarth (born 16 June 1988) is a Swedish professional golfer who has played on the Ladies European Tour and U.S.-based LPGA Tour. She won the 2014 Ladies Slovak Open and held the first round lead at the 2013 Women's British Open.

Early life and amateur career
Lennarth was born in Stockholm in 1988 and trained at Saltsjöbaden Golf Club. By 2004 she was a member of the National Team and played in the European Young Masters and the Junior Ryder Cup, where she was teamed with Rory McIlroy and Carlota Ciganda.

She played in the 2005 and 2006 European Girls' Team Championship, securing a silver in 2005 in a team with Anna Nordqvist, Linn Gustafsson and Anna Dahlberg Söderström. She played in the 2007, 2008, 2009 and 2010 European Ladies' Team Championship, winning the event on home soil in 2008 with Anna Nordqvist, Pernilla Lindberg, Caroline Westrup, Jacqueline Hedwall and Caroline Hedwall. She also won the 2010 event at La Manga Club together with the Hedwall twins, as well as securing the individual medalist honors.

She won bronze at the 2010 Espirito Santo Trophy in Argentina together with Louise Larsson and Caroline Hedwall.

Lennarth attended the University of Alabama between 2007 and 2011 and played with the Alabama Crimson Tide women's golf team for four years. She was a three-time NCAA All-American.

Professional career
Lennarth turned professional in 2012 and joined the Symetra Tour, where she had a season-best tie for 5th at the Symetra Classic. 

In 2013, she joined the Ladies European Tour after finishing 6th at Q-School. She was runner-up at the South African Women's Open and became the first round joint leader at the 2013 Women's British Open, where she carded a career low 66, six under par. She finished the season ranked 45th on the Order of Merit.

Lennarth won her maiden LET title at the Ladies Slovak Open in 2014, by four strokes over Mel Reid. The win propelled her to a career high of 105th in the Women's World Golf Rankings and she finished the season ranked 14th on the LET Order of Merit. In 2015, she won the Swedish Matchplay Championship, beating Louise Ridderström, 6 and 5, in the final.

In 2016, she finished tied for 3rd at the RACV Ladies Masters in Australia and again at the Ladies European Masters in Germany. She qualified for the 2016 U.S. Women's Open and made the cut at the 2016 Women's British Open to finish 9th on the LET Order of Merit, a career best. In 2017, after another 3rd place finish at the Fatima Bint Mubarak Ladies Open, she finished 12th.

Lennarth earned conditional status for the 2018 LPGA Tour through Q-School and played 14 tournaments, making the cut in half, to finish 142nd on the LPGA Tour money list.

She returned to the LET and in 2019 and 2020 she finished 37th and 41st in the LET rankings. In 2021, Lennarth played in only five LET events before having to cut her season short due to a hip injury. She served as the first tee starter at the remaining Aramco Team Series events for the rest of the year.

Professional wins (5)

Ladies European Tour (1)

Swedish Golf Tour (2)

Other wins (2)
2014 Abbekås Open (Swedish Mini-tour Future Series)
2017 Lindesbergs Open (Swedish Mini-tour Future Series)

Results in LPGA majors

CUT = missed the half-way cut
"T" = tied

Team appearances
Amateur
Junior Ryder Cup (representing Europe): 2004 (winners)
European Young Masters (representing Sweden): 2004
European Girls' Team Championship (representing Sweden): 2005, 2006
European Ladies' Team Championship (representing Sweden): 2007, 2008 (winners), 2009, 2010 (winners)
Espirito Santo Trophy (representing Sweden): 2010

References

External links

Swedish female golfers
Alabama Crimson Tide women's golfers
Ladies European Tour golfers
LPGA Tour golfers
Golfers from Stockholm
1988 births
Living people